A primary ticket outlet is an organization that contracts directly with venues and promoters to sell event tickets on its behalf.

Primary ticket outlets have a direct relationship with the owner of a venue or event. They will often use software to manage the sale of tickets for their clients.

Booking fees

Primary ticket outlets charge a booking fee that is paid by the consumer to help pay for services.

Examples

There are a number of primary ticket outlets around the world including:

 Ticketmaster (owned by Live Nation Entertainment)
 AXS (owned by Anschutz Entertainment Group)
 See Tickets
 GigsAndTours.com
SeatGeek
Zoonga

References

Ticket sales companies